Vaskelovo is a rural locality on Karelian Isthmus, in Vsevolozhsky District of Leningrad Oblast, and an important station of the Saint Petersburg-Hiitola railroad, being the final destination of many suburban electric passenger trains from Finlyandsky Rail Terminal and Devyatkino.

Rural localities in Leningrad Oblast
Karelian Isthmus